Barishab is a Union of Kapasia Upazila of Gazipur District in the Division of Dhaka, Bangladesh. Barishab is a part of the old Bhawal Estate and falls within its boundary.

References

Unions of Kapasia Upazila